Yerkir Media (literally "World Media") is an Armenian television station that began operating in 2004. It is the first television station affiliated with a political party: the Armenian Revolutionary Federation.

See also
Yerkir

References

External links
 
 Armenian TV
 Erkir Media TV

Television channels and stations established in 2004
2004 establishments in Armenia
Armenian-language television stations
Television networks in Armenia